Nofaroj is a village and jamoat in north-western Tajikistan. It is part of the city of Istaravshan in Sughd Region. The jamoat has a total population of 10,875 (2015). It consists of 10 villages, including Obkarchaghay (the seat), Dahyak, Navobod, Nofaroj, Qadamjo and Sughdiyona.

References

Populated places in Sughd Region
Jamoats of Tajikistan